Alucita nasuta is a moth in the family Alucitidae. It is found from Colombia north to Mexico.

References

Moths described in 1877
Alucitidae
Moths of South America
Moths of Central America
Taxa named by Philipp Christoph Zeller